Ernst Middendorp (born 28 October 1958) is a German football coach of SV Meppen.

Education
Middendorp was born in Freren. Prior to coaching he was a lecturer of economics, political science and informatics at vocational colleges . In 1996, he attained his UEFA Pro License (Fußball-Lehrer) from the Deutsche Sporthochschule in Köln, Germany. In 2000, he began studying communication and management at PR Kolleg Berlin, Germany, where he studied through 2002.

Career
Middendorp has coached professional football on the highest level for nearly 20 years in Europe, Asia and Africa, having a UEFA Pro License (Fussball-Lehrer) from the German Football Association. In addition, Middendorp has experience analyzing FIFA world cup tournaments (2006 and 2010), as well as the EURO tournament in 2012.

Middendorp started his coaching career with VfB Alstätte where he coached from July 1985 to June 1987. He then moved on to Eintracht Nordhorn where he was head coach from 1 July 1987 to 18 April 1988.

Middendorp's first stint as Arminia Bielefeld head coach was from 18 April 1988 to 8 October 1990. His first match was a 2–1 loss to SG Wattenscheid 09. He finished the 1987–88 2. Bundesliga season with two wins, one draw, and seven losses. Arminia Bielefeld finished in last place and were relegated. He went on to become head coach of VfB Rheine from November 1990 to June 1992. After VfB Rheine, Middendorp was head coach of FC Gütersloh between 1 July 1992 and 30 June 1994. He finished 13th in the 1992–93 season and ninth in the 1993–94 season.

Middendorp took over as head coach of Arminia Bielefeld for a second time on 25 August 1994. He finished with a record of 40 wins, 26 draws, and 47 losses in his second stint. During his tenure, the club was promoted to the Bundesliga in 1996. In 2005, when Arminia Bielefeld was celebrating its 100th anniversary, Middendorp was elected their "Coach of the Century".

Middendorp was head coach of KFC Uerdingen 05 from 25 March 1999 to 30 June 1999. He had five, two draws, and two losses in nine matches during his time at Uerdingen.

Middendorp was head coach of VfL Bochum between 1 July 1999 and 25 October 1999. During his time at Bochum, he had a record of three wins, three draws, and five losses.

Middendorp then went to Ghana to become the head coach of Asante Kotoko between January 2000 and June 2002. He returned to Germany to become head coach of FC Augsburg on 1 July 2002. He was at Augsburg until 28 September 2003. He had a record of 21 wins, eight draws, and 16 losses. He then returned to Ghana to become head coach of Hearts of Oak between March 2004 and June 2004. He then went to Iran to become head coach of Tractor Sazi between July 2004 and June 2005.

Middendorp returned to Africa to become head coach the South African Castle Premiership team Kaizer Chiefs from the beginning of the 2005–06 season up to 4 March 2007. His first match was a 1–0 win against Bush Bucks F.C. At the start of the 2006–07 season, Middendorp guided his team to the SAA Supa 8 trophy. The Kaizer Chiefs defeated Supersport United in the final. Middendorp's departure happened on 4 March 2007. His final match was a 2–1 loss to AmaZulu F.C.

On 14 March 2007, he started his third stint as a coach at Arminia Bielefeld, but was fired by club management on 10 December 2007. From there he went to coach the Chinese club, Changchun Yatai, but left the club in December 2008 and returned to Germany, where he signed a contract with Rot Weiss Essen On 6 April 2009, he left the team after just 29 days. He had won only one match during his 29 days. On 7 May 2009, he joined Cypriot club, Anorthosis Famagusta, but was fired on 24 July 2009 following their elimination in the second round of the 2009–10 UEFA Europa League. On 16 November 2009, he replaced Gordon Igesund as head coach of Maritzburg United, and was coach until 12 March 2011. He won five out of the final 15 league matches. His final match was a 2–2 draw against Vasco da Gama on 5 March 2011.

Middendorp was head coach of Golden Arrows between 21 March 2011 and 30 September 2011. Golden Arrows won two out of five matches to finish the 2010–11 season. His final match was a 2–1 win against Kaizer Chiefs. On 18 January 2012, Middendorp returned to Maritzburg United. He resigned as head coach of Maritzburg United on 10 October 2013 before joining Bloemfontein Celtic as head coach on 11 October 2013. Celtic finished off the 2013–14 season with nine wins in 24 league matches. He left the club on 14 December 2014. His final match was a 0–0 draw against Moroka Swallows on the same day. He coached the Eastern Province SA Premier League team Chippa United from 5 January to 30 March 2015. Middendorp didn't win any matches at Chippa United.

In the 2015–16 season Ernst led not one but two South African Premier League teams from the relegation position to safety. He took Free State Stars from position 16 at the bottom of the league on matchday three to position six within four months, averaging two points a game. On 28 December 2015, Ernst returned to Maritzburg United (a club he coached twice before) who were then in position 16 and facing the stark danger of relegating. Ernst and his team narrowed the gap until the final nail-biting game of the season when Maritzburg United moved to the safety of position 14.

Middendorp returned to Kaiser Chiefs on 7 December 2018. His first match was a 1–0 win against SuperSport United on 12 December 2018. Kaizer Chiefs finished the 2018–19 season in ninth place. Kaizer Chiefs finished the following season in 2nd place and qualified for the 2020–21 CAF Champions League. Then he coached Saint George between 23 October 2020 and 24 November 2020.

Middendorp returned to Maritzburg United on 26 November 2020. his first match was a 2–1 loss to SuperSport United on 27 November 2020.

Middendorp has been the mentor of Fadlu Davids, who spent much of his time learning the coaching trade as assistant coach to Middendorp: at Maritzburg, Bloemfontein Celtic and Chippa United.

In March 2023, he returned to Germany to manage SV Meppen.

Coaching record

References

External links

German football managers
German footballers
Living people
Expatriate football managers in China
1958 births
KFC Uerdingen 05 managers
VfL Bochum managers
FC Augsburg managers
Kaizer Chiefs F.C. managers
Arminia Bielefeld managers
Changchun Yatai F.C. managers
Rot-Weiss Essen managers
Anorthosis Famagusta F.C. managers
Lamontville Golden Arrows F.C. managers
Saint George S.C. managers
Maritzburg United F.C. managers
FC Gütersloh 2000 managers
Tractor S.C. managers
Association footballers not categorized by position
Accra Hearts of Oak S.C. managers
Asante Kotoko S.C. managers
People from Emsland
Footballers from Lower Saxony
Bielefeld University alumni
Expatriate football managers in Ghana
German expatriate football managers
German expatriate sportspeople in Ghana
Expatriate football managers in Iran
German expatriate sportspeople in Iran
Expatriate soccer managers in South Africa
German expatriate sportspeople in South Africa
German expatriate sportspeople in China
Expatriate football managers in Cyprus
German expatriate sportspeople in Cyprus
Bloemfontein Celtic F.C. managers
Chippa United F.C. managers
SV Meppen managers
German expatriate sportspeople in Ethiopia
Expatriate football managers in Ethiopia
Ethiopian Premier League managers
Persian Gulf Pro League managers
West German footballers
West German football managers
3. Liga managers
Bundesliga managers
2. Bundesliga managers
Chinese Super League managers